Days (stylized as DAYS) is a Japanese sports manga series written and illustrated by Tsuyoshi Yasuda. It was serialized by Kodansha's Weekly Shōnen Magazine from April 2013 to January 2021, with its chapters collected in 42 tankōbon volumes. In North America, the manga is licensed for English digital release by Kodansha USA. A 24-episode anime television series adaptation by MAPPA was broadcast from July to December 2016. As of December 2020, the Days manga had over 10 million copies in circulation. In 2016, the manga won the 40th Kodansha Manga Awards for the shōnen category.

Plot
Days follows the struggles of Tsukushi Tsukamoto, a shy, clumsy and bullied teenager about to start high school. He decides to get into Seiseki High School so he can be with his neighbour and childhood friend Sayuri Tachibana, who is one year his senior. Just as he is bullied after visiting Sayuri at her work, Tsukushi is saved by Jin Kazama, who scares away the bullies by attacking them with nunchucks, and declares himself to be a vagrant and lost in town. Jin then asks Tsukushi if he likes football and asks him to join him the same night for a futsal match as his team is one player short. Tsukushi surprises Jin by showing up after running almost ten miles under the heavy rain and without one shoe, after another run-in with his bullies. Short, young and clumsy, Tsukushi plays incredibly bad but keeps running throughout the whole match despite having injured his foot, showing such an effort that it motivates his other teammates. After a final sprint, Tsukushi manages to score the decisive goal, smashing his head against the pole by doing it. He finds out later that Jin will also be a freshman at Seiseki, and decides to join the football club to play with him, unknowing that the football club in Seiseki is nationwide famous and looked after by students from all the country. He manages to make it to the team despite being incredibly frail, weak and clumsy thanks to his continuous efforts and amazing perseverance, and further he shows incredible ability in motivating the rest of the team to work as hard as possible.

Characters

Main characters

He is a high school freshman who plays as forward for Seiseki High School. Although quite clumsy at the start, Tsukushi shows amazing perseverance and effort which allow him to become a fundamental part of the team. Tsukushi lost his dad as a child and lives with his mom, who is paralyzed and has to use a wheelchair.

He is a freshman in Seiseki High School, like Tsukushi, and like him he also plays as a forward. Unlike Tsukushi, though, Jin is considered a genius footballer, tall, good-looking, eccentric, and incredibly popular and extroverted. He also appears aloof and somewhat unmotivated before meeting Tsukushi. Jin is fond of dressing up, and rarely follows the rules, which he can manage to do thanks to his genius. He is also a devoted fan of Bruce Lee. Whenever Tsukushi is in need of a handkerchief, Jin often gives him a pair of female panties to use. 
Since his talent at football made him difficult to handle, his mom decided to enroll him in boarding school from a very young age. His talent also put him in conflict with his teammates, often, which eventually led to him quitting his middle school team and considering retiring from football. His random encounter with Tsukushi rekindles his passion for it, though. Jin starts as a forward, but as the story progresses he becomes more versatile and starts playing more as a midfielder.

Seiseki High School

Soccer club
 

He is the star and captain of Seiseki's soccer team. Like Tsukushi, he started high school as a completely soccer novice and was a terrible player as a freshman but became an amazing player thanks to extraordinary effort. Now in his final year, he will be joining the Kashima professional football club after graduation. He is not very bright, and has a terrible sense of direction, and is also fond of using neologisms to explain his goals and convey his meaning about plays to the exasperation of most of his team mates. Mizuki is also well known for being an extremely physical forward, which has earned him the nickname of "the monster" or "the beast". He is also one of "Tokyo's big three", the nickname that distinguishes the top players in the region.
 

He is a second year student who plays as offensive midfielder. As the number 10 player Kimishita is the playmaker of Seiseki's team. He works in his parents's shop and is a great student. He is also a prodigy footballer, and was selected for Tokyo's city team during middle school. As the story progresses, Kimishita also specializes as a set piece kicker. He has a strong rivalry with fellow 2nd. year student Ōshiba. He also shows a strong rivalry with fellow, rival playmakers Indou and Taira.

He is a second year student who plays as forward. Typically he would be substituted by Tsukushi during the second half of games. A football prodigy who started playing as a toddler, he was previously famous for his lack of commitment, as he seemed to care only for scoring, leaving up the defense and tactical work to his teammates. Like others, Tsukamoto's amazing effort and perseverance leads him to change his style, becoming a much better team player and displaying much sacrifice for the team. Oshiba is one of the tallest players in all of Japan, and is the son of wealthy physicians. He is very arrogant and silly, often calling himself "Hero". His lack of intelligence is similar to that of Mizuki's, and he is obsessed with becoming Seiseki's captain as soon as the latter one graduates. His older sister has a crush on Mizuki.
 

He is a third year student, and the second captain of Seiseki's team. A defender, Usui is characterized by his tactical ability. Although Mizuki is the captain, the role is largely symbolic as it's Usui who really controls the movements of the team, hence most of his teammates call him "Sergeant Usui". Although He is not in the top ten, rivals would often praise his defending skills. He is somewhat misanthropic and does not care much about others until he sees Mizuki's growth and dedication. He is also a very good cook.
 

She is a classmate of Tsukushi and Jin. She is a haughty and popular student, egotistical at first and quite hard on Tsukushi. After receiving much criticism for the novels and short stories she wrote she decided to quit writing, so when she discovers Tsukushi's perseverance and effort in spite of the criticisms of many (including her) she softens up to him and decides to join the team as an assistant manager. As a manager she becomes incredibly passionate for football and learns about tactics and strategy. She also develops a friendship of sorts with Hoshina, the captain of Touin Academy.
 

Another first year, Kurusu is a midfielder. Originally focused on fine football playing, he changes his style to a more physical once as a result of observing Tsukushi's sacrifice. He has been friend and teammate with Nitobe and Shiratori since elementary school, and together they're called the "1st Year Idiot Trio".
 

A first year, Nitobe is a center back. Playing a more physical defense style than Usui, out of the "1st Year Idiot Trio" (Kurusu, Shiratori, and Nitobe), he is the one that plays the most often as a regular. He appeared to be envious of Tsukushi's progress in such short time as compared to the many years he has devoted to the game of football.
 

The last member of the "1st Year Idiot Trio", Shiratori is a forward and the only of the trio who does not play regularly, despite the fact that he seems to have good shooting accuracy.
 

A 1st-year goalkeeper. Somewhat quiet, Inohara thinks of him as a prodigy goalkeeper.

Others

She is a childhood friend and neighbor of Tsukushi, whom she calls Tsuku-chan. A second-year student at Seiseki, she also works in a fast food restaurant.

Rivals

Indou is one of the main characters of Yasuda's previous manga Furimukuna Kimi wa. His duo with fellow genius soccer Narukami has made their school, Sakuragi High School, become a National stronghold. He is a genius playmaker who displays amazing field vision so that he can give precise assists. He has a strong rivalry with Seiseki's Mizuki, who like him is called one of "Tokyo's big three". Just like Mizuki, Indou is also one of the "top-tens", a nickname given to those High School students who have received an offer by a professional football team. Tsukushi meets Indou by coincidence in a train, and then Indou invites him to play a futsal game. Later, Seiseki plays against Sakuragi in the Tokyo qualifiers to the Summer Inter High School tournament.

Narukami is the other main character in Yasuda's previous manga Furimukuna Kimi wa. His duo with fellow genius football Indou has made their school, Sakuragi Academy, become a National stronghold. A short and frail guy, who was unable to play soccer before high school due to his bronchial asthma, he turns into a different person while playing, to the point of becoming bullish and arrogant. He is a superb forward, incredibly fast and precise. Tsukushi has Narukami in great regard, due to his skill despite being as short and frail as he himself is.

The captain of Touin Academy, Takumi is the younger of the three Hoshina brothers, who are nationwide famous, with the oldest being professional and the other one being the top scorer in the collegiate league. Takumi plays as a libero, and is also one of "Tokyo's big three". Just like Mizuki and Indou, Hoshina is also one of the "Top ten", and will play for a professional team as he graduates. Although a great dribbler, Hoshina generally sticks to solid defense and is depicted as a risk-averse and safe player, and in charge of coordinating his whole team. Seiseki plays Touin Academy in the finals of the Tokyo qualifiers to the Winter inter high school tournament.

The captain of Seikan High School in Aomori, that Seiseki plays against during the summer camp. Just like Mizuki, Taira will be joining the Kashima professional football team after graduation. Taira is a playmaker with a strong physical ability, able to send powerful yet precise passes. His duo with Seikan's star rookie forward Himura allows Seikan to go to the Winter Nationals.

Seikan High School's ace striker, Himura is a very fast forward, a skill that is taken advantage of by Taira. As a freshman, he shows a strong rivalry with Kazama over who's the best rookie player of the two.

The star forward and ace striker of Ichiboshi Academy, he is the only second. year student in the "top ten", meaning he already has a professional team offer. A prodigy footballer, Aiba has been the top scorer in every single category he has played. An outstanding dribbler and all-around forward, he is nationwide famous, and the center piece in his school offensive football style. As part of the same generation, Kimishita and Oshiba both feel a strong sense of rivalry towards him.

The captain of Ryouzan High School, champions of the Summer Inter High Schools tournament. Another of the "top ten" players (of which his team has other two), Katou is boasted as the best high school defensive midfielder and likely the best player overall, which has granted him a seat in the National team of his category. He is well known for his stamina and his tireless leadership and grit, with rivals commenting on how his face would show up anywhere around the pitch, a result of his tireless energy and his superb understanding of plays, characteristics that other players see as well on Tsukushi, with Jin suggesting Tsukushi that Katou is the player that he should try and look after.

Ryouzan High School football team's number 10, and a key member of the National team of his category, Ikariya is a superb offensive midfielder, nicknamed "Japan's Treasure". Ikariya is incredibly popular and is even sponsored for advertisement. A very versatile and highly technical player, Ikariya possesses amazing dribbling, ball control, incredible reaction times, and long distance shooting with his left foot, which is the reason for his other nickname, "The left of God". He is the second of Ryouzan's "top ten" players.

Takagi is the third of Ryouzan High School's "top ten" players, the most of reserved of the three but arguably the most dangerous of them. Takagi is considered the best fullback in the history of Japanese High School football thanks to his strong physique, amazing speed and crossing ability. Since both Katou and Ikariya are often missing due to their playing for the National team, it's Takagi who is at the core of Ryouzan's team, and who gets the most respect from his fellow players. A country bumpkin, he often finds himself at odds with the celebrity of both Katou and Ikariya.

Sunayama is the goalkeeper of Otowa Academy from Shizuoka. He is the U-18 Japan National Team goalkeeper and also one of the top ten. A superb all-around goalkeeper famous from a very young age, for his outstanding reflexes, tactical knowledge, and leadership, he led his high school team to two consecutive finals, in spite of his giving precedence to the National Team.

Media

Manga

Written and illustrated by Yasuda Tsuyoshi, Days was serialized in Kodansha's Weekly Shōnen Magazine from April 24, 2013, to January 20, 2021. Kodansha collected its chapters in forty-two tankōbon volumes, released from July 17, 2013, to March 17, 2021.

Kodansha USA publishes the manga in a digital-only format since April 25, 2017.

Anime
An anime television series adaptation by MAPPA began airing on July 2, 2016. Crunchyroll streams the series with English subtitles as it airs in Japan. Crunchyroll misreported that the Days anime had been licensed for a second season.

Two original video animations are bundled with the 21st and 22nd volumes of the manga, released on March 17 and May 17, 2017, respectively. The original animation DVDs (OADs), depicting the All-Japan High School Soccer Tournament's Tokyo Preliminary Round with Tōin Academy, were bundled with the limited editions of manga volumes 26 to 28 on March 16, May 17, and July 17, 2018.

Episode list

Reception
Volume 2 reached the 44th place on the weekly Oricon manga charts and, as of September 22, 2013, has sold 24,745 copies; volume 3 reached the 36th place and, as of November 24, 2013, has sold 35,528 copies; volume 4 reached the 41st place and, as of January 19, 2014, has sold 24,837 copies; volume 5 reached the 32nd place and, as of March 23, 2014, has sold 41,911 copies; volume 6 reached the 40th place and, as of May 18, 2014, has sold 25,067 copies; volume 7 reached the 25th place and, as of July 20, 2014, has sold 34,421 copies; volume 8 reached the 18th place and, as of September 21, 2014, has sold 41,871 copies; volume 9 reached the 21st place and, as of December 21, 2014, has sold 44,586 copies; volume 10 reached the 20th place and, as of February 22, 2015, has sold 49,901 copies. The manga had 4.5 million copies in print as of January 2017. As of December 2020, the manga had over 10 million copies in circulation.

Days ranked #12 in the "Nationwide Bookstore Employees' Recommended Comics" by the Honya Club website in 2014. The series was nominated for the shōnen category at the 39th Kodansha Manga Awards in 2015, and won in the same category at the 40th Kodansha Manga Awards in 2016.

References

External links
 Manga official website 
 Anime official website 
 

2013 manga
Association football in anime and manga
Kodansha manga
Japanese webcomics
MAPPA
Shōnen manga
Webcomics in print
Winner of Kodansha Manga Award (Shōnen)